The National Archives of Austria  Also known as the  Austrian State Archives  in Vienna is the central archive of the republic of Austria. On the basis of the Austrian Federal Archives Act, it stores the archives of the federal government. The tasks of the Archives are described as follows: recording, taking over, storing, preserving, repairing, organizing, developing, utilizing and making usable federal archive material for research into history and the present, for other research and science, for legislation, jurisdiction,  for administration, and the legitimate concerns of citizens. Blocking / Archiving periods of up to 110 years can apply to archive holdings.

See also 
List of national archives
Austrian National Library

References

External links
Official website (English)
Official website (German)

Austria
Archives in Austria